Ambulong (also spelled Ambolon) is a small island in the Philippines located on the western side of the Ambolon Strait, that separates it from Ilin Island. Ambulong is located in Occidental Mindoro province of the Philippines, part of the municipality of San Jose.

The entire island constitutes one barangay with the same name in the municipality of San Jose. Its population in the 2020 census was 2,435 persons, up from 2,224 in 2015 and 1,539 in the 2010 census.

See also

 List of islands of the Philippines

References

Islands of Occidental Mindoro